Bernard Ulman (December 16, 1917 – 1986) was an American football and lacrosse official.

Personal
Ulman played as a lacrosse midfielder at the University of Maryland from 1938 to 1943 and also played football for the school. In addition to officiating, he was a salesman of sports equipment.

American football
Ulman officiated in the National Football League (NFL) for fifteen years and was selected to officiate in Super Bowl I and Super Bowl IX.

Lacrosse
Ulman was one of the most well-known officials in the sport which spanned twenty years. He was inducted into the National Lacrosse Hall of Fame as an official in 2003.

References

1917 births
1986 deaths
Maryland Terrapins football players
Maryland Terrapins men's lacrosse players
National Football League officials